Amelia Okoli-Okpalaoka (14 May 1941 – 1 November 2017) was a female track and field athlete from Nigeria. She specialised in the high jump event during her career. Okoli represented Nigeria at the 1964 Olympic Games. She claimed a gold medal for her native West African country at the 1965 All-Africa Games. Okoli finished tenth in the 1958 British Empire and Commonwealth Games high jump.

External links

Amelia Okoli's obituary

1941 births
2017 deaths
Nigerian female high jumpers
Olympic athletes of Nigeria
Athletes (track and field) at the 1964 Summer Olympics
Commonwealth Games competitors for Nigeria
Athletes (track and field) at the 1958 British Empire and Commonwealth Games
African Games gold medalists for Nigeria
African Games medalists in athletics (track and field)
Athletes (track and field) at the 1965 All-Africa Games
20th-century Nigerian women